James Laughlin (March 1, 1806 – December 18, 1882) was an Irish-American banker and capitalist, a pioneer of the iron and steel industry in Pittsburgh, Pennsylvania.

He was born near Portaferry in County Down, Ireland, the son of James Laughlin, Sr.  He was educated at Belfast, and after leaving school he assisted his father in taking care of his estate until age twenty, when his mother died and the family came to America. Upon his arrival he entered into partnership with his brother Alexander.

Involvement in Pittsburgh
In 1854, Laughlin bought the retiring Bernard Lauth's interest in the steel partnership with Benjamin Franklin Jones. The company was renamed Jones and Laughlin in 1861, later reorganized as J&L Steel.

In 1844, Laughlin was appointed as a corporator to the board responsible for establishing the Allegheny Cemetery.
In 1852, Laughlin and his associates, including B.F. Jones, founded a banking organization that, when chartered, was the First National Bank of Pittsburgh, later Pittsburgh National Bank.

Laughlin was the first president of the Western Theological Seminary in Pittsburgh.

He was a founder of the Pennsylvania Female College, which later became Chatham University.  Laughlin died on December 18, 1882.

References

External links
Jones & Laughlin Steel Corporation Historical Records, 1871-1953, AIS.1973.07, Archives Service Center, University of Pittsburgh.
Records of the Jones and Laughlin Steel Corporation, MSS#33, Historical Society of Western Pennsylvania.

1806 births
1882 deaths
People from County Down
American steel industry businesspeople
Businesspeople from Pittsburgh
Burials at Allegheny Cemetery
American bankers
19th-century American businesspeople